The following is a list of notable people associated with Youngstown State University, located in the American city of Youngstown, Ohio.

Notable alumni

Actors, musicians, and artists
Harry L. Alford, arranger and composer of band marches
Pat DiCesare, entrepreneur and rock and roll promoter
Harold Danko, jazz pianist
Bob DiPiero, country music songwriter who has written 15 #1 hits
Khaledzou, music producer and member of noise pop duo MUNNYCAT
Sean Jones, jazz recording artist, lead trumpeter for Lincoln Center Jazz Orchestra
Emanuel Kiriakou, songwriter, producer, singer, and multi-instrumentalist, based in Los Angeles
Edward Leffingwell, art critic and curator
Ben Neill, composer, performer, inventor of the mutantrumpet
Ed O'Neill, actor, known as Al Bundy on Married... with Children and Jay Pritchett on Modern Family
Roland F. Seitz, composer, bandmaster, and music publisher
Michael S. Smith, jazz drummer and percussionist

Activism
Sean Barron, autism rights movement leader; authored two books on autism 
Jerry Lee, President of the Jerry Lee Foundation
Evelyn G. Lowery, American Civil Rights Movement activist and leader; marched in the historic Selma to Montgomery March

Athletes
Tony Aiello, former NFL player, Brooklyn Tigers and Detroit Lions
Hank Allen, former MLB outfielder, pinch hitter and third baseman for the Washington Senators, Milwaukee Brewers and Chicago White Sox
Ron Allen, former MLB first baseman for the St. Louis Cardinals 
Al Campana, former NFL running back, Chicago Bears
George Cappuzzello, former MLB pitcher for the Detroit Tigers and Houston Astros
Billy Clapper, basketball coach, IMG Academy
Craig Cotton, former NFL tight end, Chicago Bears and Detroit Lions
Caylen Croft, former WWE wrestler
Bob Davie, former Notre Dame football coach; former ESPN commentator; head coach of the University of New Mexico
Dave Dravecky, former MLB pitcher, San Diego Padres and San Francisco Giants
Sloko Gill, former NFL center, Detroit Lions
Ralph Goldston, former NFL running back, Philadelphia Eagles
Brad Hennessey, former MLB pitcher, Baltimore Orioles and Houston Astros
Ron Jaworski, former NFL quarterback, Philadelphia Eagles, color commentator for ESPN Monday Night Football
Tim Johnson, former NFL linebacker, Baltimore Ravens and Oakland Raiders
Donald Jones, NFL wide receiver for the New England Patriots
Larry Jordan, NFL linebacker and defensive back for the Denver Broncos
Andy Kosco, former MLB outfielder and first baseman 
Don Leshnock, former MLB pitcher for the Detroit Tigers
Quentin Lowry, former NFL linebacker, Washington Redskins
Lamar Mady, former NFL offensive lineman, Oakland Raiders
Ray Mancini, former boxer
Mark Mangino, college football coach; former head coach at Kansas
Vince Marrow, former NFL tight end, Buffalo Bills
Marcus Mason, professional football player, NFL  running back, Washington Redskins
Paul McFadden, 1984 NFL Rookie of the Year, President of the YSU Foundation 
Ed McGlasson, former NFL center, New York Jets, Los Angeles Rams and New York Giants
Leo Mogus, former NBA player
Pat Narduzzi, head coach of the University of Pittsburgh
Kelly Pavlik, former boxer
Kendrick Perry, professional basketball player, Sydney Kings of the NBL
Carmen Policy, NFL executive, San Francisco 49ers and Cleveland Browns
Brandian Ross, professional football player, NFL  cornerback, Green Bay Packers
Rick Shepas, head football coach at  Waynesburg University
Ken Smith, former MLB first baseman and left fielder  for the Atlanta Braves 
Cliff Stoudt, former NFL quarterback, Pittsburgh Steelers, St. Louis Cardinals, Arizona Cardinals and Miami Dolphins
Russell Stuvaints, former National Football League defensive back, Pittsburgh Steelers
Vytautas Šulskis, professional Lithuanian basketball player, BC Šiauliai of Lithuania
Justin Thomas, MLB relief pitcher
Jeff Wilkins, professional football player, NFL kicker for the St. Louis Rams

Business
Sam Bahour, Palestinian American businessman and entrepreneur
Joseph G. Brimmeier, former Chief Executive Officer of the Pennsylvania Turnpike Commission
Thom Brodeur-Kazanjian, CEO of Yandy.com
Mary Ann Campana, founder of Pollyanna Clothes and a record breaking aviator.
Nanette Lepore, fashion designer
Milan Puskar, founder of Fortune 500 company Mylan Laboratories
Sonny Vaccaro, founder of ABCD Basketball Camp; marketing executive for Nike, Reebok and Adidas
 Ryan Wood, co-founder of the Under Armour company

Crime
Donna Roberts, convicted of the murder of her ex-husband

Government and politics
Amy Acton, director of Ohio Department of Health during the COVID-19 pandemic
Vincent A. Biancucci, former member of the Pennsylvania House of Representatives
Charles J. Carney, former US Congressman
Peter C. Economus, United States federal judge on the United States District Court for the Northern District of Ohio
Ron Gerberry, former member of the Ohio House of Representatives
Nathaniel R. Jones, former judge U.S. Court of Appeals for the Sixth Circuit
Rich Kasunic, Pennsylvania State Senator
Jim Lynch, former member of the Pennsylvania House of Representatives
Riyad Mansour, Permanent Representative to the United Nations from Palestine
Harry Meshel, former president of the Ohio State Senate; chairman of the Ohio Democratic Party
Sylvester Patton, former member of the Washington State Senate
Margarita Prentice, former member of the Ohio House of Representatives
Leslie H. Sabo, Jr., Vietnam War Medal of Honor recipient (did not graduate)
Chris Sainato, Pennsylvania state representative
Amy Salerno, former member of the Ohio House of Representatives
Patricia Haynes Smith (graduate study), Democratic member of the Louisiana House of Representatives from Baton Rouge, Louisiana
A. William Sweeney, former Ohio Supreme Court Justice
James Traficant, former U.S. Congressman
Jay Williams, appointed by President Obama to cabinet position in the Office of Recovery for Auto Communities and Workers; former mayor of Youngstown

Journalism and media
Christopher Barzak, author whose first novel, One for Sorrow, was made into the Sundance Feature Film Jamie Marks is Dead
Simeon Booker, first black reporter for The Washington Post
Elfreda Chatman, known for her ethnographic approaches in researching information seeking behaviors among understudied or minority groups 
Noah Cicero, novelist, short story writer, and poet
Mark Dailey, Canadian newscaster for Citytv
Frank Marzullo, meteorologist for WXIX-TV, the Fox network affiliate in Cincinnati, Ohio
David Lee Morgan, Jr.,  sportswriter; author; motivational speaker; literacy facilitator; author of LeBron James: The Rise of A Star (2003)
Jerry Nachman, former vice president of MSNBC cable news network
Ed Rosenthal, author; criminal defendant (did not graduate)

Religion
Robert M. Nemkovich, sixth Prime Bishop of the Polish National Catholic Church
Nicholas (Smisko), former metropolitan bishop of the American Carpatho-Russian Orthodox Diocese

Science and technology
John Blangero, human geneticist; highly cited scientist in the field of complex disease genetics
Steven R. Little, chemical engineer, pharmaceutical scientist, and department chair of Chemical Engineering at the University of Pittsburgh
John McGinness, physicist and physician; contributed to the modern field of organic electronics
Amit Patel, cardiothoracic surgeon and world pioneer of stem cell therapy for heart failure

Space exploration
Thomas Bopp, astronomer; co-discoverer of Comet Hale-Bopp
Ron Parise, NASA astronaut, STS-35 and STS-37

Notable scholars and administrators
Christopher Barzak, author
Adam Earnheardt, academic and author
Paul Sracic, political scientist and author
Jim Tressel, college football coach and university administrator
Bruce Waller, philosopher

References

External links
 Youngstown State University Alumni Association

Youngstown State University people